Sundarban Express is an intercity express train in Bangladesh Railway which runs between the capital city Dhaka and the southwestern city Khulna. It has started its operation on 17 August 2003.

References

Passenger rail transport in Bangladesh